Harikrishnan S. is an Indian actor and a classical dancer who appears in Malayalam cinema. He made his debut in the 2010 film Malarvaadi Arts Club directed by Vineeth Sreenivasan, a commercial success after which he was cast in more films. Some of his notable roles were in Chattakkari, Ohm Shanthi Oshaana, Monayi Angane Aanayi, Aadu Series and Anjam Pathira.

Personal life

Harikrishnan was born in Vaikom, Kerala. He is the elder son of Sreekumar MG and Jayasree VT. He completed his schooling at SMSN H.S.S, and graduated with a Bachelor of Arts degree in English from Maharaja's College, Ernakulam. He married Divya on 22 May 2016.

Filmography 
Films

 Television Works

References

External links
 

Male actors in Malayalam cinema
Male actors from Kottayam
Indian male film actors
21st-century Indian male actors
Year of birth missing (living people)
Living people